Patrick "Pat" Collinson,  (10 August 1929 – 28 September 2011) was an English historian, known as a writer on the Elizabethan era, particularly Elizabethan Puritanism. He was emeritus Regius Professor of Modern History, University of Cambridge, having occupied the chair from 1988 to 1996. He once described himself as "an early modernist with a prime interest in the history of England in the sixteenth and seventeenth centuries."

Life
Collinson was born in Ipswich, the son of Cecil Collinson and Belle Hay Patrick. His father came from a Yorkshire Quaker family, and both Patrick's parents were Christian missionaries. He later wrote that his childhood home was "an evangelical hothouse where the Second Coming was expected daily". Before he was 20, he was baptised at Bethesda Chapel in Ipswich.

After a short spell at Bethany School in Goudhurst, Kent, and Huntingdon Grammar School, Collinson was educated at King's School, Ely, and Pembroke College, Cambridge from 1949 to 1952. He was also trained as a radar mechanic during his national service in the Royal Air Force. He became a postgraduate student at the University of London in 1952 under the supervision of the Tudor historian J. E. Neale, who handed him some notes on East Anglian Puritanism; in 1957 Collinson completed his doctorate on Elizabethan Puritanism, its 1,200-page size causing the administration to impose a word limit on future dissertations; it was published in 1967 as The Elizabethan Puritan Movement, which showed Puritanism to be a significant force within the Elizabethan Anglican Church instead of merely a radical group of individuals, becoming a standard work.

Collinson was a lecturer at the University of Khartoum, and from 1961 assistant lecturer in ecclesiastical history at King's College London (where he taught Desmond Tutu). In 1960 he married Elizabeth Albinia Susan Selwyn, a nurse. He thought about becoming an Anglican minister but in the end chose not to.

In 1969 Collinson emigrated to Australia to become chair of the history department of Sydney University. Although he appreciated a more open-minded approach favouring interdisciplinary studies, he opposed what he termed the "fungus" of postmodernism and so returned to England in 1976 as professor of history at the University of Kent. He was President of the Ecclesiastical History Society (1985-86). He was chair of modern history at the University of Sheffield from 1984 to 1988 before he succeeded Sir Geoffrey Elton as Cambridge Regius Professor of History, where his attempt to reform the tripos failed due to opposition from within; his inaugural lecture was entitled "De Republica Anglorum: Or, History with the Politics Put Back."

By the time of his retirement in 1996, Collinson was one of the doyens of English Reformation history. His short summation of the period, The Reformation, was published in 2003. Collinson's work laid the foundations, in many ways, for what historians of the English Reformation currently term the 'Calvinist Consensus' in the latter decades of the 16th century and during the reign of James I/VI. As such, the belief that Puritanism was anything but religiously radical in relation to English, and indeed British, culture stands as one of his great achievements as an historian.

In July 2000 Collinson was awarded an honorary doctorate from the University of Essex. In 2011 Boydell Press published Collinson's memoir The History of a History Man Or, the Twentieth Century Viewed from a Safe Distance: The Memoirs of Patrick Collinson as part of its Church of England Record Society Series. Collinson was the founding president of the society in 1991.

Collinson's political views were left-wing; he was a republican and a supporter of the Campaign for Nuclear Disarmament.

Works
Letters of Thomas Wood, Puritan, 1566–1577 (ed.) (1960)
 'A Mirror of Elizabethan Puritanism: The Life and Letters of Godly Master Dering (London: Dr. Wiliams's Trust, 1964) search onlineThe Elizabethan Puritan Movement (Methuen, 1967) read onlineArchbishop Grindal, 1519–1583: The Struggle for a Reformed Church (London: J. Cape, 1979) search online read onlineThe Religion of Protestants: The Church in English Society, 1559–1625 (Oxford: Clarendon Press, 1982) search onlineEnglish Puritanism (London: Historical Association, 1983) search online read onlineGodly People: Essays on English Protestantism and Puritanism (London: Hambledon Press, 1983) search online read onlineThe Birthpangs of Protestant England: Religious and Cultural Change in the Sixteenth and Seventeenth Centuries: The Third Anstey Memorial Lectures in the University of Kent at Canterbury, 12–15 May 1986 (Macmillan, 1988) search onlineAndrew Perne: Quartercentenary Studies: Patrick Collinson, David McKitterick, Elisabeth Leedham-Green, edited by David McKitterick (Cambridge University Library, 1991) search onlineElizabethan Essays (London: Hambledon Press, 1994) search online
 A History of Canterbury Cathedral, edited by Patrick Collinson, Nigel Ramsay, and Margaret Sparks (Oxford University Press, 1995) search online
 Belief and Practice in Reformation England: A Tribute to Patrick Collinson from His Students, edited by Susan Wabuda and Caroline Litzenberger) (Aldershot, Hants, 1998) search onlineShort Oxford History of the British Isles: The Sixteenth Century (editor) (Oxford University Press, 2002) reviewLady Margaret Beaufort and Her Professors of Divinity at Cambridge: 1502 to 1649 (Cambridge University Press, 2003) read onlineElizabethans (London: Hambledon and London, 2003) search online read onlineThe Reformation: A History (Modern Library, 2003) read onlineElizabeth I (Very Interesting People Series, 2007) read onlineFrom Cranmer to Sancroft: Essays on English Religion in the Sixteenth and Seventeenth Centuries (Bloomsbury Publishing, 2007) read onlineThe Reception of Continental Reformation in Britain, edited by Polly Ha and Patrick Collinson (Oxford University Press, 2010) search online read onlineThe History of a History Man; Or, the Twentieth Century Viewed from a Safe Distance: The Memoirs of Patrick Collinson (Woodbridge, Suffolk: Boydell Press, 2011) (Church of England Record Society Series). . review reviewRichard Bancroft and Elizabethan Anti-Puritanism (Cambridge University Press, 2013) review

Notes

Further reading
 Fletcher, Anthony, and Peter Roberts, eds. (2006), Religion, Culture and Society in Early Modern Britain: Essays in Honour of Patrick Collinson Greengrass, Mark. "The Reformation (2003); or, Religious Change in Early Modern Europe from a Safe Distance." History 100.342 (2015): 573–583. evaluates Collinson's 2003 book.
 Kewes, Paulina. "‘A mere historian’: Patrick Collinson and the Study of Literature." History 100.342 (2015): 609–625.
 McDiarmid, John F., The Monarchical Republic of Early Modern England: Essays in Response to Patrick Collinson (Ashgate Publishing, 2007) read online
 Marshall, Peter. "The Birthpangs of Protestant England: Religious and Cultural Change in the Sixteenth and Seventeenth Centuries (1988)" History (2015) 100#342, pp 559–572. evaluates of Collinson's book, The Birthpangs of Protestant England''

External links
Interview
Obituary in The Telegraph
Obituary in History Today

1929 births
People educated at King's Ely
Alumni of Pembroke College, Cambridge
Academics of King's College London
Campaign for Nuclear Disarmament activists
English historians
English republicans
Fellows of Pembroke College, Cambridge
Fellows of Trinity College, Cambridge
Historians of Puritanism
Reformation historians
Presidents of the Ecclesiastical History Society
2011 deaths
Commanders of the Order of the British Empire
Academic staff of the University of Khartoum
Members of the University of Cambridge faculty of history
English male non-fiction writers
People educated at Bethany School, Goudhurst
Regius Professors of History (Cambridge)
Fellows of the British Academy